Lehigh Township is a township in Northampton County, Pennsylvania. The population of Lehigh Township was 10,526 as of the 2010 census. It is part of the Lehigh Valley metropolitan area, which had a population of 861,899 and was the 68th most populous metropolitan area in the U.S. as of the 2020 census. 

Geography
It is drained by the Lehigh River, which separates it from Lehigh County and Blue Mountain separates it from Carbon County to the north. Its villages include Berlinsville, Cherryville, Danielsville, Lehigh Gap (also in Lehigh County/Lehigh Valley), Pennsville, Rockville, and Treichlers.

Adjacent municipalities
Moore Township (east)
Allen Township (south)
North Whitehall Township, Lehigh County (south)
Washington Township, Lehigh County (west)
Walnutport (west)
East Penn Township, Carbon County (tangent to the northwest)
Lower Towamensing Township, Carbon County (north)

Climate
The township has a humid continental climate (Dfa/Dfb) and the hardiness zones are 6a and 6b. Average monthly temperatures in Cherryville range from 28.0 °F in January to 72.2 °F in July.

Demographics

As of the census of 2000, there were 9,728 people, 3,680 households, and 2,833 families residing in the township.  The population density was 327.7 people per square mile (126.5/km2).  There were 3,816 housing units at an average density of 128.6/sq mi (49.6/km2).  The racial makeup of the township was 98.67% White, 0.36% African American, 0.20% Native American, 0.17% Asian, 0.16% from other races, and 0.43% from two or more races. Hispanic or Latino of any race were 0.74% of the population.

There were 3,680 households, out of which 31.7% had children under the age of 18 living with them, 67.0% were married couples living together, 6.9% had a female householder with no husband present, and 23.0% were non-families. 18.0% of all households were made up of individuals, and 8.2% had someone living alone who was 65 years of age or older.  The average household size was 2.62 and the average family size was 2.98.

In the township, the population was spread out with 22.5% under the age of 18, 6.3% from 18 to 24, 29.5% from 25 to 44, 27.9% from 45 to 64, and 13.7% who were 65 years of age or older.  The median age was 41 years. For every 100 females, there were 102.9 males.  For every 100 females age 18 and over, there were 98.6 males. The median income for a household in the township was $48,263, and the median income for a family was $55,216. Males had a median income of $37,307 versus $27,206 for females. The per capita income for the township was $21,400.  About 2.3% of families and 2.9% of the population were below the poverty line, including 3.1% of those under age 18 and 4.1% of those age 65 or over.

Politics and government

The Township is governed by a five member Board of Supervisors. The chairman of the board is currently Michael Jones, whose term expires in 2024. The Township also elects the positions of auditor and tax collector and appoints various other civil servants including an engineer, solicitor, and township manager.

Budget
The Township balanced its budget for the 2023 fiscal year, with a total revenue approximately 5.3 million dollars. Approximately 50% of the Township's FY23 budget is allocated for police and public safety programs.

Legislators

State Representative Zach Mako, Republican, 183rd district
State Senator Nick Miller, Democrat, 14th district
US Representative Susan Wild, Democrat, 7th district

Elections
The Township is divided into five voting precincts: Central, Danielsville, Pennsville, Treichlers, and Northwestern. In the 2022 Pennsylvania elections, turnout across the Township was 66 percent. Republican candidates generally perform better in the Township, however democratic candidates sometimes win in local races.

Public education
The Township is served by the Northampton Area School District, with one of its component elementary schools, Lehigh Elementary School, located in the township. Students in grades nine through 12 attend Northampton Area High School in Northampton. Lehigh Township is also served by the 20th Intermediate Unit.

As part of the Northampton Area School District, residents are eligible to read at the Northampton Area Public Library.

Arts, culture, and recreation
Four parks are currently managed by the Township. These parks generally provide sporting facilities, areas for event hosting and picnicking. The Township's most recent park, the Delps Park, has dog friendly facilities. An additional park is managed the non-profit Lehigh Township Athletic Association (LTAA), which it uses to host Baseball, Softball, Soccer, Flag Football, and Basketball.

The Township's close proximity to multiple trails in adjacent communities make hiking a popular activity among residents. Notably, the Township is close to the Appalachian Trail. Other popular activity include skiing and snowboarding at the Blue Mountain Resort, kayaking in the Lehigh River, golf and social activities at the private Woodstone Country Club.

Media

Four print publications circulate throughout the Township; the largest is The Morning Call, which covers the Lehigh Valley. Other print publications include the Times News, its sister publication the Northampton Press, and a local Walnutport-based paper, The Home News.

Community Organizations
Residents of the Township on a volunteer basis have developed and manage a historical society and a fire company. The Township is also populated by a variety of faith communities, and notably hosted the now defunct Mary Immaculate Seminary.

Transportation

Transportation throughout the Township is heavily dependent on private vehicle ownership, with minimal sidewalk coverage and public transportation options. Four State Highways, PA Routes 145, 248, 873 and 946 pass through the Township and provide broader access to the Lehigh Valley. The Township's nearest Interstate Highway connection is Interstate 476 which is accessible approximately 13 miles away near the northern terminus of Route 248 near Lehighton. Other local roads of note include Blue Mountain Drive, Cherryville Road, Indian Trail Road, and Mountain View Drive.

The Township is within the service footprint of the Lehigh and Northampton Transportation Authority (LANTA), which provides bus service via its LANta Flex route 503, which stops at the Walnut Plaza in downtown Walnutport off of Route 145.

The nearest airport is Lehigh Valley International Airport; there is also a local airport in nearby Slatingon.

References

External links

 Lehigh Township official website

Townships in Northampton County, Pennsylvania
Townships in Pennsylvania